Henry G. Bailly (October 29, 1828 – January 7, 1865) was an American businessman and politician.

Bailly was born in Minnesota and his father was Alexis Bailly. He lived in Hastings, Minnesota with his wife and family and was a merchant; Bailly served as the postmaster of Hastings in 1854 and 1855.. Bailly served in the Minnesota Territorial Council in 1856 and 1857 and was a Democrat. He then served in the Minnesota Democratic Constitutional Convention in 1857 and in the Minnesota Senate in 1857 and 1858. Bailly served in the Union Army during the American Civil War and was killed in the Battle of Nashville in 1865.

References

1828 births
1865 deaths
People from Hastings, Minnesota
People of Minnesota in the American Civil War
Businesspeople from Minnesota
Members of the Minnesota Territorial Legislature
Democratic Party Minnesota state senators
Minnesota postmasters